Bridget Elizabeth Sloan (born June 23, 1992) is an American artistic gymnast. She is the 2009 world champion in the all-around, the 2009 United States national champion, and a silver medalist with the American team at the 2008 Summer Olympics in Beijing.

From 2012 to 2016, Sloan was a member of the University of Florida women's gymnastics team, which has won three consecutive NCAA National Championships titles. She is also the 2013 NCAA national champion in the all-around and on the balance beam, and the 2014 NCAA champion on the uneven bars. In 2015, she became the first University of Florida gymnast, and the seventh NCAA gymnast, to score a perfect 10 on each of the four events. At the 2016 NCAA Nationals, her final championship, she won the all-around, uneven bars, and balance beam titles.

Early life
Bridget Elizabeth Sloan was born on June 23, 1992, in Cincinnati, Ohio, grew up in Pittsboro, Indiana, and graduated from Tri-West Hendricks High School. She began gymnastics at the age of 4 and trained at Sharp's Gymnastics Academy in Indianapolis.

Elite gymnastics career

2007
In her first year as a senior, Bridget placed fifth in the all-around and third on bars at the U.S. National Championships, and was the alternate on the American team for the 2007 World Championships. She represented the United States at the Good Luck Beijing Olympic test event in December, winning the bronze medal in the all-around and a silver on floor exercise.

2008
In March 2008, Bridget suffered a torn meniscus while warming up at a meet in Italy. She returned home for surgery and rehabilitation, and recovered in time to compete at the National Championships—where she performed only on beam, bars, and floor—and the U.S. Olympic Trials. Bridget was named to the Olympic team after the final selection camp in July 2008.

At the Olympics, Bridget competed in both the qualifying and team final rounds. Her performances became critical in the qualifications, where the Americans were forced to put up only four athletes on three events, and count all four scores, after Chellsie Memmel and Samantha Peszek were injured. Bridget made small errors on floor and uneven bars but performed well overall. Her all-around scores placed her 11th among all competitors. In the team finals, she competed on vault, contributing a 15.200 score to the American team's silver medal.

2009
In February 2009, Bridget competed in the American Cup and placed second to 13-year-old Jordyn Wieber. In August, she competed at Nationals and won the all-around, floor and uneven bars.

In October, at the 2009 World Championships in London, Bridget qualified fifth for the all-around and seventh for the uneven bars final. In the all-around final, she won the gold medal over teammate Rebecca Bross by 0.050, becoming the fifth American woman to win the world all-around title. In the bars final, she placed sixth.

2010
Injuries plagued Bridget throughout the year, greatly limiting her in competitions. An ankle injury early in the year limited her participation in the Pacific Rim Championships to bars. The same injury kept Bridget to the beam at the U.S. Classic. A new pectoral injury prevented her from defending her national all-around title. At Nationals, she performed two tentative beam routines, one that included a fall, and placed 11th on the apparatus. However, Bridget impressed National Team Coordinator Márta Károlyi with her improvement at the selection camp, and was brought to the World Championships to perform on bars and floor, placing fourth in the bars final.

2011
Bridget sat out the majority of the competitive season while recovering from surgery on her bicep. She stated that it was unlikely she would take part in the 2011 National or World Championships in an effort to stay healthy for the 2012 season, her ultimate goal being the 2012 Olympics.

Although Bridget did not compete in the 2011 National Championships, she later went to the Karolyi Ranch in New Waverly, Texas, to participate in both selection camps for the 2011 World Championships team. She was subsequently named to the team for the 2011 Pan American Games. She competed only on the uneven bars and floor exercise, and scored in the thirteens on both apparatus. She failed to qualify for either of the event finals, but on uneven bars it was due to the "two [athletes] per country" rule (Bridgette Caquatto and Shawn Johnson both scored higher than her).

2012
As a result of Bridget's injuries and her participation in the Pan American Games the previous year, she was able to successfully petition for a spot at the 2012 National Championships. She had intended to compete at the U.S. Classic, but decided not to out of respect for her coach, who would have been unable to attend because he was at his father's funeral. At the championships, she performed in all four events for the first time since 2009, coming sixth on the uneven bars and tenth in the all-around. She was chosen to compete at the Olympic Trials, but on the first night of the Trials, she injured her elbow during bars warmup and was forced to withdraw, ending her chances at the London Olympic Games and her national team career.

NCAA career
Bridget accepted an athletic scholarship to attend the University of Florida in Gainesville, where she was a member of the Florida Gators women's gymnastics team, then under the leadership of Rhonda Faehn. Bridget deferred enrollment until the 2012 fall semester, which allowed her to seek a second consecutive spot on the U.S. Olympic team for the 2012 Summer Olympics. Due to injury, Bridget was forced to withdraw from the 2012 U.S. Olympic Trials, and rejoined 2010 World Championship teammate Mackenzie Caquatto on the Florida Gators team.

In 2013, at her first NCAA Championship with the Gators, Bridget captured the all-around title with a score of 39.600. She then led her team to their first NCAA Championship title, scoring 39.75 all-around. In event finals, Bridget also won the beam title. Bridget is an eight-time All-American (first-team honors in all-around, uneven bars, balance beam and floor exercise at the NCAA Championship; first-team honors for all-around, uneven bars and balance beam, and second-team in vault in the first National Association of Collegiate Gymnastics Coaches (NACGC) All-America regular-season awards).  After the season, Bridget was named as the 2013 recipient of the Honda Sports Award, recognizing her as the outstanding women's college gymnast. She was only the fourth freshman to win in the award's 37-year history, and the second consecutive Florida freshman to win the award.

2014 was Bridget 's second season with the Gators, who won their second consecutive NCAA National Championships as a team. Individually, Bridget was the NCAA National Champion on the uneven bars, was a first-team All-American on vault and bars and second team All-American on floor. She was named NACGC Southeast Region Gymnast of the Year and earned NACGC first team All-American status on all four events.

In the first meet of the 2015 season, against Ball State on January 11, 2015, Bridget was named the SEC Specialist of the Week for her 10.0 score on vault. However, she also injured her ankle and was sidelined for five meets. She returned to competition toward the end of the regular season. She was a member of the Gators team as they won their third consecutive NCAA National Championships title, and individually placed second on vault and uneven bars, earning first team All-American honors. Bridget  also placed sixth in the all-around. She has become the first gymnast from Florida to achieve perfect 10.0 scores on all four events, and is only the seventh NCAA gymnast ever to achieve the feat.

Bridget earned her second NCAA All-Around title in her final year at Florida in 2016, also winning the beam and uneven bars.

Routines and skills

Elite (2008) 
 Vault: Double-twisting laid-out Yurchenko — 5.8 difficulty
 Uneven bars: Glide kip, cast to handstand (KCH) + toe-on to handstand 1/2 (C) + Endo 1/2 (C) + toe-on shoot to high bar (B); KCHS 1/2 + giant + stalder to handstand 1/1 (Frederick) (D) + straddled Tkatchev (D); KCHS + piked stalder (D) + toe-on Tkatchev (Ray) (E); KCHS + toe-on to handstand (C) + overshoot to handstand on low bar (D) + stalder shoot to high bar (Ray) (C); KCHS + giant + giant + full-twisting double layout dismount (E) — 6.7 difficulty
 Balance beam: Press to handstand to clear pike support mount (C); front aerial walkover (D) + aerial cartwheel (D); full turn with leg at horizontal (C); front tuck (D); back handspring step-out (B) + layout step-out (C); switch split leap (C) + back tuck (C) + sheep jump (D); free walkover to arabesque (D); split jump (A) + wolf jump (A); round-off (B) + double pike dismount (E) — 6.5 difficulty
 Floor exercise: Round-off + back layout 3/2 (C) to round-off + back handspring + back layout 3/1 (E); round-off + back handspring + piked full-in (E); switch split ring leap (C) + split leap 1/1 (C); front handspring + front layout 2/1 (Tarasevich) (D); triple spin with leg below horizontal (C); round-off + back layout 2/1 (C); straddle jump 1/1 (Popa) (C); round-off + back handspring + double pike (D) — 6.3 difficulty

Elite (2009) 
 Vault: Double-twisting laid-out Yurchenko — 5.8 difficulty
 Uneven bars: Glide KCHS + toe-on to handstand 1/2 (C) + Endo 1/2 (C) + toe-on Shaposhnikova (Maloney) (D); KCHS + toe-on to handstand 1/1 (Hoefnagel) (D) + straddled Tkatchev (D); KCHS + toe-on piked Tkatchev (Church) (E); KCHS + toe-on to handstand (C) + overshoot to handstand on low bar (D) + stalder shoot up to high bar (Ray) (C); KCHS + giant + giant + full-twisting double layout dismount (E) — 5.9 difficulty
 Balance beam: Stoop through to clear pike support (B); split leap 1/1 (D); front tuck (D) + back handspring step-out (B) + layout step-out (C); full turn with leg at horizontal (C) + full turn (A); split jump (A) + wolf jump (A); front aerial walkover (D) + aerial cartwheel (D); switch split leap (C) + back tuck (C); round-off (B) + double pike dismount (E) — 6.1 difficulty
 Floor exercise: Round-off + back layout 3/2 (C) to round-off + back handspring + back layout 3/1 (E); round-off + back handspring + piked full-in (E); switch split leap (B) + split leap 1/1 (C); front handspring + front layout 5/2 (Randi) (D); triple turn with leg below horizontal (C); double turn with leg at horizontal (D); round-off + back handspring + double pike (D) — 5.9 difficulty

Elite (2010) 
 Uneven bars: Jump to hang on high bar; KCHS + toe-on piked Tkatchev (Church) (E) + Pak salto (D); KCHS + toe-on to handstand 1/2 (C) + forward toe-on to handstand 1/2 (C) + toe-on Shaposhnikova (Maloney) (D) + overshoot to handstand on low bar (D) + stalder shoot up to high bar (Ray) (C); KCHS + toe-on to handstand 1/1 (Hoefnagel) (D) + double layout dismount (D) — 6.1 difficulty
 Balance beam: Stoop through to clear pike support (B); split leap 1/1 (D); split leap (A) + split jump (A); front aerial walkover (D) + back handspring step-out (B) + layout step-out (C); full turn with leg at horizontal (C); aerial cartwheel (D); front tuck (D); switch split leap (C) + back tuck (C); round-off (B) + double pike dismount (D) — 5.8 difficulty
 Floor exercise: Round-off + back layout 3/2 (C) to round-off + back handspring + back layout 3/1 (E); round-off + back handspring + piked full-in (E); full turn with leg at horizontal (B); switch split leap (B) + split leap 1/1 (C); front handspring + front layout 2/1 (Tarasevich) (D); triple turn with leg below horizontal (C); round-off + back handspring + double pike (D) — 5.6 difficulty

Elite (2012) 
 Vault: Full-twisting laid-out Yurchenko — 5.0 difficulty
 Uneven bars: Jump to hang on high bar; KCHS + toe-on to handstand 1/1 (Hoefnagel) (D) + piked Tkatchev (E); KCHS + toe-on piked Tkatchev (Church) (E) + Pak salto (D); KCHS + toe-on to handstand 1/2 (C) + forward toe-on to handstand 1/2 (C) + toe-on Shaposhnikova (Maloney) (D) + overshoot to handstand on low bar (D) + stalder shoot up to high bar (Ray) (C); KCHS + giant + giant + double layout dismount (D) — 6.4 difficulty

NCAA (2014) 
 Vault: Full-twisting laid-out Yurchenko
 Uneven bars: Jump to hang on high bar; KCHS + Ray II; KCHS + toe-on + bail to handstand on low bar + toe-on to HB; KCHS + giant + giant + double layout dismount
 Balance beam: Stoop through to clear support; back handspring + layout step-out; front aerial to scale; switch leap + split leap; full turn; side aerial; round-off, layout 2/1 dismount
 Floor exercise: Front handspring + front layout 2/1 (Tarasevich); split leap 1/2 + straddle jump; back handspring, back handspring, double pike; round-off, back layout 3/2; front layout

Competitive history

Floor music
 Araba (2008–2009)
 Harem (2010–2011)
 Hup (2012)
 Till I Collapse (2013)
 Seven Nation Army (2014)
 Whirlwind by Spoll (2016)

References

External links 

 
 
 
 
 
 

1992 births
Living people
American female artistic gymnasts
Florida Gators women's gymnasts
Gymnasts at the 2008 Summer Olympics
Gymnasts at the 2011 Pan American Games
Medalists at the 2008 Summer Olympics
Medalists at the World Artistic Gymnastics Championships
Olympic silver medalists for the United States in gymnastics
Pan American Games gold medalists for the United States
Sportspeople from Cincinnati
People from Hendricks County, Indiana
World champion gymnasts
Pan American Games medalists in gymnastics
Gymnasts from Indiana
U.S. women's national team gymnasts
Medalists at the 2011 Pan American Games
NCAA gymnasts who have scored a perfect 10
21st-century American women